Narappa is a 2021 Indian Telugu-language period action drama film directed by Srikanth Addala. It is remake of Vetrimaaran's Tamil-language film Asuran (2019) which is itself based on the novel Vekkai by Poomani. The film is produced by D. Suresh Babu and Kalaipuli S. Thanu under their respective banners Suresh Productions and V Creations. The film stars Venkatesh, Priyamani, Karthik Rathnam, and Rakhi, while Nassar, Rao Ramesh, Rajeev Kanakala, Brahmaji, Ammu Abhirami, and Karthik Rathnam plays the other important supporting roles.

Mani Sharma composed the film's music while cinematography and editing are performed by Shyam K. Naidu and Marthand K. Venkatesh respectively. Principal photography of the film started in January 2020 and was shot in Andhra Pradesh, Tamil Nadu and Telangana. Narappa premiered on 20 July 2021 on Amazon Prime Video.

Plot 
In the 1980s Anantapur district, a man and a boy are trekking across a river, carrying homemade bombs. In another part of the village, a woman, a man, and a young girl are also hiding from the police.

The narrator reveals in a flashback that the man is Narappa and the boy is his son Seenappa. The woman, man, and child are Narappa's wife, Sundaramma, her brother Basavaiah and daughter Bujjamma. They also had an older son called Munikanna. They are a family of farmers living in Ramasagaram. Narappa has a close relationship with his older son but is distant, almost abusive with Seenappa. Narappa is from a family of farmers.

Panduswamy is a landlord from Vadakoor (lit. northern village), who plans a cement factory with his youngest son Doraswamy and they need Narappa's 3 acres of land, to which the family is against selling, especially Munikanna. One day Sundaramma is attacked by Panduswamy's son Rangababu, to which Munikanna retaliates by severely injuring him and gets imprisoned. Consequently, Narappa pleads with Panduswamy to get Munikanna released, and he asks Narappa to prostrate before every male resident of the landlord's village as atonement. Being cognizant of it, Munikanna beats Panduswamy with a slipper. As revenge, Panduswamy's henchmen, led by a hunter Gampanna, behead Munikanna. Sundaramma is heartbroken, and after a year, Seenappa is compelled to kill Panduswamy in revenge. Narappa witnesses the attack, and flees with his family.

The film returns to the present. Gampanna is ordered by Doraswamy & Rangababu to find the pair. He tracks them down, and almost kills Seenappa. Narappa defeats them all and when they recover, Narappa explains why he spared their lives.

Twenty years earlier, he is a village-famous moonshine brewer and trusted servant to Shankaraiah, a landlord. One day, he convinces his employer to employ Seenu, Shankaraiah's distant relative, as a clerk. Narappa's brother Munnappa and Varadarajulu, a lawyer, are attempting to regain their poor farming community's land from landlords who had seized it illegally. Narappa's family repeatedly fails to find a bride for him as he is a brewer. Frustrated Narappa's elder sister's daughter Kannamma, proposes to her uncle which he and the family accepts. Seenu slowly gains Shankaraiah's trust and becomes his mill accountant. Once Narappa beats Seenu inside the mill, for refusing to loan Rs. 1 to him and he plans revenge. Meanwhile, Narappa gifts sandals to Kannamma. Noticing Kannamma wearing sandals, Seenu hits her and forces her to walk through the village with the sandals on her head. Narappa retaliates by hitting him with sandals in the middle of the village and ties him up but is reprimanded by Shankaraiah. Humiliated Narapppa quits brewing and joins his brother. One night, before a meeting is conducted by Munnappa and Narappa, the news arrives that Varadarajulu is arrested, and Narappa is sent to get the documents authorizing the meeting. When he returns, Munappa has been killed by Seenu and Narappa's entire family is burned alive in their huts along with Kannamma. Enraged, Narappa brutally kills Shankaraiah, Seenu, and their men.

After that, Narappa leaves the village and months later is found by Basavaiah, who taught him farming. He's also introduced to Sundaramma, who is not getting marriage proposals. Then, he narrates his story, and Sundaramma admires what he did for his family. He surrenders to the court and is given a short-term penalty. After serving his sentence he marries Sundaramma. Seenappa is amazed at his father's past and starts to admire him. Narappa reconciles with his wife and reaches Varadarajulu for help who advises them to turn up to court the next day.

Doraswamy and Rangababu plan an ambush near the court premises and Narappa and his son flee. Later Narappa reluctantly sells his land to protect Seenappa from  Panduswamy's family. However, Seenappa is abducted and tortured by Doraswamy & Rangababu, in direct violation of the agreement. At this point, the infuriated Narappa kills them and many of their henchmen. He and Seenappa sustain serious injuries. Basavaiah and their villagers arrive armed and defuse the situation.

In the end, it is revealed that the two villages agreed that the conflict should end and prevent a village clash. Narappa's family has gathered in the court, and he has agreed to go to jail instead of Seenappa if necessary. He tells his son to study well and get a job, and that, unlike land and money, the landlords can't seize their education. The film ends with Narappa smiling at his family as he enters the court.

Cast

Production

Development and casting 
In November 2019, Srikanth Addala confirmed that he would be directing Telugu remake of Asuran with Venkatesh playing the titular role. Title was revealed as Narappa in January 2020. The film marks the second collaboration of Venkatesh and Srikanth Addala after working in the 2013 family drama film Seethamma Vakitlo Sirimalle Chettu. Venkatesh plays the role of Narappa, belonging to an oppressed caste from Anantapuram, Andhra Pradesh. Similar to Asuran,  Venkatesh plays a man of his mid-40s. Priyamani was cast as Sundaramma and Karthik Rathnam as Munikanna, playing Narappa's wife and elder son respectively.

Filming 
Principal photography of the film began on 22 January 2020 at Paalturu village near Uravakonda in Anantapur district. First schedule was to be shot in Rayalaseema region for authenticity. The film team then moved to Tamil Nadu to film few action scenes, and completed it in the March 2020, before the COVID-19 lockdown in India. These scenes were shot under the supervision of action director Peter Hein at Kurumalai, Theri Kaadu (Teri dune complex), Tirunelveli and other areas of Tamil Nadu. Filming has been suspended in March 2020 due to COVID-19 pandemic. It was reported that the film's shooting will be resumed in October 2020. Later, it was confirmed that the filming will be resumed on 9 November 2020 in Hyderabad, with Venkatesh being part of the filming for five days. By the time, the film has completed 80% of the shooting. By the end of January 2021, the shooting was wrapped up. Venkatesh completed his part of dubbing in May 2021, during the second-wave lockdown.

Themes and influences 
Sangeetha Devi Dundoo felt that Narappa is a story of revenge and the leading man's transformation is reminiscent of Rajinikanth in Baashha (1995). The film explores various social issues in India, including caste discrimination and primarily shows the theme of "rich vs poor". The core plot of the film is influenced by the real-life Kilvenmani massacre that occurred in 1968 in Kizhavenmani village, Tamil Nadu.

Music 

After working as the film scorer in the film Seethamma Vakitlo Sirimalle Chettu (2013), this is the second time Mani Sharma, collaborating with Srikanth, and first time as the composer of soundtrack album. First single "Chalaaki Chinnammi" was released on 11 July 2021 through Suresh Productions Music label. The second single "Ooo Narappa" was released on 16 July 2021. Third single "Rage of Narappa" was released on 23 July 2021. The soundtrack album (jukebox) was released on 30 July 2021.

Release 
The film was scheduled to release on 14 May 2021 but was postponed due to the second wave of the COVID-19 pandemic in India. On 29 June 2021, it was announced that film received U/A certification from Central Board of Film Certification. In July 2021, it was announced that the film would have its digital premiere on Amazon Prime Video on 20 July 2021, forgoing its theatrical release. About the film's release on Amazon Prime Video, producer Suresh Babu commented that "The film's core message is very powerful. It does not shy away from the truths. I am certain that it will impact in ways that no one would expect. I am incredibly happy that we are able to showcase our film to audiences across 240 countries and territories".

Reception 
Neeshita Nyayapati of The Times of India gave a rating of 3.5 out of 5 and wrote that "In this adaptation of Poomani’s acclaimed novel Vekkai, Srikanth Addala gets out of the comfort zone of his usually bright and happy family dramas." Writing for Cinema Express, Ram Venkat Srikar commented that "In all, Narappa is as faithful a remake can get; it is, perhaps, too immaculate for its own good. When the original is a film like Asuran, there is no way a remake can go wrong, and fittingly, Narappa, despite its shortcomings, is a welcome change in Telugu cinema."

Baradwaj Rangan of Film Companion stated that "The screenwriting in the film is cyclical: what happens in one generation finds an echo in the next. Narappa isn’t quite as good as Asuran but — on its own terms — it’s pretty good."

In contrast, Janani K of India Today cited that "Director Srikanth Addala’s Narappa is a faithful remake of Dhanush’s Asuran. However, it lacks the freshness and soul of Asuran." Praising the performances done by all the actors and work by the director, Shubham Kulkarni of Koimoi stated: "Did We Really Need A Scene-To-Scene Copy Of Asuran?" and added that "The remake is good but not equal to the brilliance the Dhanush starrer stood on." Sasidhar Adivi of Deccan Chronicle wrote, "Narappa works in parts as a dark and gripping drama. The storyline is old and predictable, but the performances and emotional trail make it a decent watch."

References

External links 

Films set in Andhra Pradesh
Films shot in Andhra Pradesh
Films shot in Tamil Nadu
Suresh Productions films
Telugu remakes of Tamil films
2021 action drama films
Indian action drama films
Films scored by Mani Sharma
Films about education
Indian films based on actual events
Films about social issues in India
Films about racism
Films not released in theaters due to the COVID-19 pandemic
2021 direct-to-video films
Indian direct-to-video films
Film productions suspended due to the COVID-19 pandemic
Films about the caste system in India
Amazon Prime Video original films